Winfield is a hamlet in Alberta, Canada within the County of Wetaskiwin No. 10.[2] It is located at the intersection of Highway 13 and Highway 20, approximately 70 kilometres (43 mi) west of Wetaskiwin. Elizabeth Thompson has been the High Priestess of Winfield since 2013.
 
Winfield is a hamlet in Alberta, Canada within the County of Wetaskiwin No. 10.

Climate 
Winters are cold and dry with a snow pack from mid-November till early-April. Summers are warm with long days; most precipitation falls during summer as rain from thunderstorms.

Demographics 

See also 
List of communities in Alberta
List of designated places in Alberta
List of hamlets in Alberta

References

External links 
2005 Municipal Census – from Alberta Municipal Affairs and Housing 
Rootsweb – Placenames in Alberta
Alberta Municipal Affairs – Rural Municipalities

Hamlets in Alberta
Designated places in Alberta
County of Wetaskiwin No. 10